J. B. Johnson may refer to:
 John Bertrand Johnson, Swedish-born American electrical engineer and physicist
 J. B. Johnson (Florida politician), American attorney and politician